{{Infobox Former Subdivision
|native_name = Vilâyet-i Sivas'
|common_name            = Sivas Vilayet
|subdivision            = Vilayet
|nation                 = the Ottoman Empire
|year_start             = 1867
|year_end               = 1922
|date_start             = 
|date_end               = 
|event_start            = Vilayet Law
|event_end              = 
|p1                     = Rûm Eyalet
|flag_p1                = 
|s1                     = Turkey
|flag_s1                = Flag of Turkey.svg
|image_flag             = 
|flag_type              = 
|image_coat             = 
|image_map              = Sivas Vilayet, Ottoman Empire (1900).png
|image_map_caption      = The Sivas Vilayet in 1900
|capital                = Sivas
|today                  = 

|stat_year1             = Muslim, 1914
}}
The Vilayet of Sivas was a first-level administrative division (vilayet) of the Ottoman Empire, and was one of the Six Armenian vilayets. The vilayet was bordered by Erzurum Vilayet to the east, Mamuretülaziz Vilayet to the south-east, the Trebizond Vilayet to the north and Ankara Vilayet to the west.

The accuracy of the population figures ranges from "approximate" to "merely conjectural" depending on the region from which they were gathered.

History

The Vilayet of Sivas was created in 1867 when eyalets were replaced with vilayets under the "Vilayet Law" (Turkish: Teşkil-i Vilayet Nizamnamesi) and was dissolved in 1922 by Atatürk's reorganization.

From 1913 to 1916, Ahmed Muammer was the Vali'' (governor) of the vilayet, and he has been accused of being complicit in actions against the Armenian population.

Administrative divisions

Sanjaks of the Vilayet:
 Sanjak of Sivas (Sivas, Bünyan, Şarkışla, Hafik, Darende, Divriği, Aziziye, Kangal, Zara, Gürün, Yıldızeli)
 Sanjak of Amasya (Amasya, Havza, Mecitözü, Vezirköprü, Gümüşhacıköy, Merzifon, Ladik)
 Sanjak of Karahisar-ı Şarki (Şebinkarahisar, Alucra, Hamidiye, Suşehri (Endires till 1875), Koyulhisar)
 Sanjak of Tokad (Created from Sivas sanjak in 1880 and gained Erbaa and Zile kazas from Amasya one) (Tokat, Erbaa, Zile, Niksar (Before 1880 it was part of Canik Sanjak of Trabzon Vilayet), Reşadiye)

Not: Reşadiye (İskefsir till 1909) was nahiya center in Hamidiye kaza of Sanjak of Karahisar-ı Şarki till 1906.

References

External links

 

 
Vilayets of the Ottoman Empire in Anatolia
Ottoman period in Armenia
History of Amasya Province
History of Çorum Province
History of Giresun Province
History of Kayseri Province
History of Malatya Province
History of Ordu Province
History of Tokat Province
History of Samsun Province
History of Sivas Province
1867 establishments in the Ottoman Empire
1922 disestablishments in the Ottoman Empire